Sadhasivan, popularly known as Pattom Sadan was an Indian actor in Malayalam cinema. He acted in more than 200 films. His debut movie was Chathurangam in 1959. He was a famous comedy artist during the 1960s and 1970s. He acted in many Tamil movies as well. He was a theatre artist turned movie actor. He hailed from Pattom, Thiruvananthapuram. He started his career with drama and later moved to Tamil movies. He was married and has two children. The family resides at Vadapalani, Chennai. He died at a private hospital at Vadapalani in 1992.

Filmography

Tamil
Bommai
 Aval Oru Thodar Kathai- 1974

Malayalam

 Hijack (1995) as Thankappan
 Simhadhwani (1992)
 Kaumaara Swapnangal (1991)
 Chakkikotha Chankaran (1989)
 Malayathippennu (1989)
 Bheekaran  (1988)
 Ormayil Ennum (1988) as Kuruppu
 Loose Loose Arappiri Loose  (1988)
 Jungle Boy (1987) as Velappan
 Aalorungi Arangorungi (1986)
 Kiraatham (1985) as Santhappan
 Prathijnja (1983) as Charayam Paramu
 Varanmaare Aavashyamundu (1983)
 Bandham (1983)
 Benz Vasu (1980)
 Vijayam Nammude Senaani (1979)
 Vaaleduthavan Vaalaal (1979)
 Aval Niraparaadhi (1979)
 Avano Atho Avalo (1979)
 Madanolsavam (1978)
 Beena (1978)
 Velluvili (1978) as Kuttappan
 Naalumanippookkal (1978)
 Aaravam (1978)
 Balapareekshanam (1978)
 Madhurikkunna Raathri (1978)
 Kaithappoo (1978)
 Anugraham (1977) as Mathew
 Amme Anupame (1977)
 Sujatha (1977)
 Snehayamuna (1977)
 Kaavilamma (1977)
 Niraparayum Nilavilakkum (1977)
 Minimol (1977)
 Satyavan Savithri (1977)
 Manassoru Mayil (1977)
 Ammaayi Amma (1977)
 Priyamvada (1976)
 Vanadevatha (1976) as Velu
 Chirikkudukka (1976) as Naanu
 Themmadi Velappan (1976) as Claver
 Kaamadhenu (1976)
 Theekkanal (1976)
 Cheenavala (1975)
 Kaamam Krodham Moham (1975)
 Kalyaanappanthal (1975)
 Chandanachola (1975)
 Love Letter (1975)
 Love Marriage (1975)
 Ullaasayaathra (1975)
 Boy Friend (1975)
 Babumon (1975) as Appunni
 Check Post (1974)
 College Girl (1974) as Haider
 Udayam Kizhakku Thanne  (1978)
 Alakal (1974)
 Urvashi Bharathi (1973)
Thaniniram(1973) as Sukumarankutty
 Ladies Hostel (1973) as Punewala
 Manthrakodi(1972)
 Jalakanyaka (1971)
 Nishaagandhi (1970)
 Nizhalattam(1970) as Band Master
 Kaattukurangu (1969)
 Agnipareeksha (1968) as Manoharan
 Lakshaprabhu (1968)
 Collector Malathy (1967) as Sarasan
 Jeevikkaan Anuvadikkoo (1967)
 Jeevithayaathra (1965)
 Arappavan (1961) as Balan
 Aval Oru Thudar Katha (1975) as Bommai

References
 http://imprintsonindianfilmscreen.blogspot.com.au/2012/12/pattom-sadan.html
 http://www.malayalachalachithram.com/profiles.php?i=1023
 http://oldmalayalamcinema.wordpress.com/tag/pattom-sadan/
 http://lifeglint.com/content/kodambakkam/131109/pattom-sadan

External links

 Pattam Sadan at MSI

1992 deaths
Indian male film actors
Male actors from Thiruvananthapuram
Male actors in Malayalam cinema
Male actors in Tamil cinema
20th-century Indian male actors